Ayomide Bamidele Akinola (born January 20, 2000) is a professional soccer player who plays as a forward for Major League Soccer club Toronto FC. Born in the United States and raised in Canada, he represents the Canada national team.

Early life 
Akinola was born in Detroit, Michigan, and moved to Brampton, Ontario in 2005. As a teenager, he played in the TFC Academy. He graduated from St. Marguerite d'Youville Secondary School in 2018.

Club career

Toronto FC II 
Akinola was called up to the Toronto FC II set-up for the 2016 USL season. On June 15, 2016, he made his debut as an 80th-minute substitute for Shaan Hundal in a 1–1 draw with FC Montreal. Akinola made his first start a week later in a 4–1 defeat to Louisville City. On July 11, he scored a brace in a 4–2 win against the Harrisburg City Islanders and was named to the USL Team of the Week. He finished the season with two goals from 10 appearances.

Akinola tried out for Eredivisie club PSV Eindhoven in November 2017.

Toronto FC 
On December 18, 2017, Akinola signed as a homegrown player with Major League Soccer side Toronto FC. He became the 15th player to graduate from the TFC Academy and sign for the first team, and the 34th academy graduate to sign a professional contract for one of the Toronto FC teams. On March 17, 2019, Akinola scored his first ever MLS goal in Toronto FC's home opener against the New England Revolution.

Akinola scored his second and third MLS goals for Toronto on July 13, 2020, in the MLS is Back Tournament in a 2–2 draw against D.C. United. He scored a hat-trick in his team's second game of the tournament against the Montreal Impact. He finished the 2020 season as the co-leading scorer for Toronto with Alejandro Pozuelo, both of whom scored 9 goals, although Pozuelo played nearly twice as many minutes.

In July 2021, Akinola suffered an ACL injury while on international duty with Canada, resulting in him missing the remainder of the 2021 season. In January 2022, Akinola would sign a contract extension with Toronto through the 2024 season, with an option for 2025.

International career 
Akinola was eligible to play internationally for the United States, Canada, and Nigeria, due to birth, residency, and heritage, respectively. While he was playing for the United States youth teams, both the Canadian Soccer Association and the Nigeria Football Federation had reached out to Akinola regarding his future at the senior international level. In 2018, Akinola commented “No time to rush. But at some point, I’m going to have to make a decision which one is the best fit for me.”

United States

In April 2015, Akinola made his international debut for the United States U15 national soccer team, appearing in a 4–1 victory against Costa Rica. The following day he scored his first international goal, netting four in a 6–2 win against Croatia. He also scored in his final appearances for the U15s in a 3–3 draw in England.

In December 2015, Akinola was called up to the United States U17 squad and played 40 minutes in a 3–2 defeat to England U16s. He scored his first goal against Brazil in March 2016, before scoring a brace against Russia a few days later. In October 2017, Akinola scored the only goal in a 1–0 victory over Ghana at the FIFA U17 World Cup in India.

He was called up to the U.S. senior team for their friendly match on December 9, 2020, against El Salvador. He scored a goal in his debut for the Americans against El Salvador, taking a knee and raising a fist in the air following his goal in a show of support for the racial equality movement.

Canada
Akinola accepted an invitation to a Canada training camp held in January 2021, but was forced to withdraw for health reasons. He then accepted an invitation to join the Canadian team for training prior to their World Cup qualifying matches on May 29, 2021. He was named to Canada's 60-man preliminary squad for the 2021 CONCACAF Gold Cup on June 18, 2021. The Canadian Soccer Association confirmed on June 30 that he had filed his one-time switch to represent Canada internationally, and was named to the final 23-man squad for the Gold Cup on July 1, Akinola made his first appearance for Canada at the tournament in their second group game against Haiti on July 15. In his second match for Canada, on July 18, 2021, Akinola faced his former country, the United States in the final round of the group stage. Akinola ruptured his ACL in the 24th minute of that match,  effectively ruling him out of not only the remainder of the tournament, but also the rest of the club season with Toronto FC.

Personal life 
Ayo's younger brother Tom was a member of the TFC Academy and has attended a Canadian under-14 camp.

Career statistics

Club

International

International goals
As of match played December 9, 2020. Akinola's team's score listed first, score column indicates score after each Akinola goal.

Honours 
Toronto FC
Canadian Championship: 2020

United States U20
CONCACAF U-20 Championship: 2018

Individual
CONCACAF Under-20 Championship Best XI: 2018

References

External links
 
 
 
 

2000 births
Living people
Soccer players from Brampton
Soccer players from Detroit
Canadian soccer players
Canada men's international soccer players
American soccer players
United States men's international soccer players
United States men's youth international soccer players
United States men's under-20 international soccer players
Canadian sportspeople of Nigerian descent
American sportspeople of Nigerian descent
American emigrants to Canada
Toronto FC players
Toronto FC II players
Association football forwards
USL Championship players
African-American soccer players
Major League Soccer players
Homegrown Players (MLS)
2021 CONCACAF Gold Cup players
Dual internationalists (football)
21st-century African-American sportspeople
20th-century African-American sportspeople